Leucadendron microcephalum, common name oilbract conebrush, is a dioecious, single-stemmed, South African shrub belonging to the family Proteaceae, endemic to the Western Cape and growing from sea level to . It is one of some 200 species in the genus, all confined to South Africa.

Description
The species is commonly known as the oilbract conebush' because of the brown, sticky, oily bracts found on both sexes when in bud, a feature setting it apart from other Leucadendron species. After flowering the bracts close, becoming hard and dry, forming a durable cone and protecting the enclosed flowerhead and heart-shaped fruits. The involucral leaves are yellow. The plants are killed by intense seasonal fires, but seeds retained in flower heads or woody capitula may survive for a number of years to produce the next generation.

Taxonomy
Leucadendron microcephalum was first described by Michel Gandoger and Hans Schinz in 1913. Phillips mistakenly published it as a new species, L. stokoei, in 1921.

Distribution and habitat
This is a highly gregarious species and is found in dense stands of hundreds of thousands of individuals, usually on mountainsides on stony sandstone soils, and particularly numerous in the vicinity of Villiersdorp. Its distribution covers Kogelberg, Kleinmond, Klein River, the Groenland Mountains north of Grabouw, Hottentots-Holland, Du Toit's Kloof Mountains, Riviersonderend Mountains, and the Swartberg above Caledon.

References

External links
Tim Honey

Bibliography
"The Proteaceae of Southern Africa" - J. P. Rourke (Purnell, 1980)
"South Africa's Proteaceae" - Marie Vogts (Struik, 1982)
"A Field Guide to the Proteas of Southern Africa" - Rebelo, Paterson-Jones (Fernwood, 1995)

microcephalum
Endemic flora of South Africa
Flora of the Cape Provinces
Fynbos